The Kayacık Dam impounds the Ayfinar Deresi, one of the two streams that join south of Gaziantep to form the Sajur River. It is located in Gaziantep Province, Turkey. The dam was constructed between 1993 and 2005 as part of the Southeastern Anatolia Project (or GAP).

See also
List of dams and reservoirs in Turkey

References

Dams in Gaziantep Province
Dams completed in 2005
Dams in the Euphrates River basin